Nemapogon nigralbella is a moth of the family Tineidae. It is found in Spain, France, Germany, Denmark, Austria, Switzerland, the Czech Republic, Slovakia, Poland, Croatia, Hungary, Bulgaria, Ukraine, Belarus, Moldova, the Baltic region, Finland, Sweden, Norway and Russia.

The wingspan is 12–17 mm. Adults are on wing from June to July.

References

Moths described in 1859
Nemapogoninae